Mic-a-holic Ai (stylized as MIC-A-HOLIC A.I.)  is the fourth studio album by Japanese-American singer-songwriter Ai, released on July 7, 2005, by Island Records and Universal Sigma. It is the best selling album of Ai's career to date, being released just after Ai's single "Story" became a hit. The album was certified double platinum by the RIAJ for 500,000 shipped copies.

Background and development 

Ai had been signed to Def Jam Japan for three years, after releasing the albums Original Ai in 2003, and 2004 Ai. Ai was seeing a steady increase in popularity, with 2004 Ai selling double her previous album's amount. In late 2004, two project albums of Ai's were released, Flashback to Ai featuring rarity material from her BMG Japan era, and Feat Ai, featuring all of her outside collaborations from 2002 until mid-2004, which also featured a new song, "Hot Spot," which was a collaboration with Uzi.

The first single from the album, "365," released in February 2005, was Ai's first top 20 single. Ai also released the single "Crayon Beats" in April that was the children's anime Crayon Shin-chan theme song, although it is not included in the album. "Story" was released in May, two months before the album.

Writing and production 

The album was recorded in 2005, mostly in Tokyo at Prime Sound Studio Form, Magnet Studio and Real & Beats Studio. "Queen" was recorded at Landmark Studio in Yokohama. Additional instrument recording occurred in Philadelphia and New York City in the United States.

The album featured continued production work from previous Ai collaborators 813, T. Kura and 2 Soul, who had all worked together with Ai on 2004 Ai. T. Kura produced three new songs ("If," "Sha La La" and "Sunshine"), while 813 produced "Summer Breeze," and 813 member DJ Yutaka produced "California" on his own. 2 Soul worked on the ballad "Story," as well as Ai's first Latin track, "Passion." Ai worked together with Aquarius on the first single "365," which also featured Aquarius member Deli as a guest rapper. "Another Day" and "Queen" were produced by Icedown, who worked with Ai for the first time on the album.

Ai self-produced the song "Once in a Lifetime," also writing and composing the song. The song also featured additional production by D/R Period.

"Summer Breeze" is a slowed down version of a song from Ai's album Original Ai (2003), called "Summer Time."

Promotion and concerts

"Story" was promoted the most from the album, appearing in TV commercials for Fuji TV Flower Center, download services M-Up and Recochoku', and Morinaga's Jelly Weider drink range. "Story" was also the June 2005 ending theme song for the TV Tokyo music show Japan Countdown. In 2012, "Story" was used as the ending theme song for the Nintendo 3DS game Rhythm Thief & the Emperor’s Treasure.

Two other songs from the album received commercial tie-ups. "365" was the Fuji TV music comedy show Hey! Hey! Hey! Music Champ ending theme song, and in October 2005, the song "Queen" was made the Yu Shirota horror film Pray's theme song.

Ai made appearances on two famous radio shows to promote the album, NHK-FM Saturday Hot Request on May 28, 2005, and her own once off show on All Night Nippon, on July 15, 2005.

Ai toured the album from July to October 2005 with the Japanese seven city tour, Mic-a-holic Ai Japan Tour '05. The tour final at Zepp Tokyo on October 24, 2005, was filmed for Ai's second live DVD, also titled Mic-a-holic Ai Japan Tour '05.
 Three songs from this album were sent to music video channels to promote the DVD, "California," "If" and "Story."

Ai performed "Story" at the 56th NHK Kōhaku Uta Gassen music competition on December 31, 2005, her first appearance on the program.

 Critical reception 

Critics received the album well. The reviews at CDJournal were impressed by the variety of genres, and were extremely impressed with her lyrics. They called "Story" a "genreless dramatic pure ballad," praising her big vocals and the "deep love overflowing" in the lyrics, calling it her version of Bill Withers' "Lean on Me." What's In? called the album "[Ai's] real masterpiece," and called the piano introduction to "Story" "memorable."

At the 2006 MTV Video Music Awards Japan, "Story" won the award for Best R&B Video.

 Chart performance 

The album debuted at number four in Japan underneath Ketsumeishi, Shōgo Hamada and Def Tech, selling 85,000 copies. In its second week, it remained at number four. The album spent seven weeks in the top 10, and 33 in the top 100. When it had stopped charting in November 2006, it had spent a total of 76 weeks on the charts, selling five and a half times its first week sales. It was initially certified platinum by the RIAJ after its release, but was eventually certified double platinum in October 2006. This is Ai's most commercially successful work, as of 2012.

In Taiwan, Mic-a-holic Ai spent two weeks charting on G-Music's top 20 Japanese/Korean subchart, peaking at number 18. It did not chart on the main combination chart, however.

 Track listing 

Personnel

Personnel details were sourced from Mic-a-holic Ais liner notes booklet.ManagerialYuki Arai – co-executive producer
Naoshi Fujikura – head publicity and promotion
Etsuro Iida – artwork coordination
Nobuhiko Kakihara – promotion planning
Aiichiro Kiyohara – A&R director
Kaz Koike – co-executive producer

Malu-K – executive producer (#7)
Shinki Miura – co-executive producer
Atsushi Nakaue – publisher
Koichi Sakakibara – artist management
Teruhisa Tanaka – publisherPerformance creditsAi – vocals, background vocals
Aaron "AB" Belinfanti – drums, percussion (#12, #15)
Damon Bennet – piano (#7)
Dave Burnett – bass (#12, #15)
Donald "Scooch: Burnside – guitar (#7)
Andrea "The Phoenix" Coln – background vocals (#7)
Tom Coyne – mastering
Jamar "G" Davis – guitar (#7)
Deli – rap (#2)
D/R Period – all instruments (#4, #6)
Ebony Fay – backing vocals (#3)
Michael "Bump" Fountain – cuts (#7)
Eric "DJ Groove" Harvey – cuts (#7)
Icedown – instruments (#3, #5)

Noriko Iso – strings (#5)
Jino (aka Kenji Hino) – bass (#11)
Kenneth Kobori – acoustic guitar (#12), keyboards (#12, #15), synthesizers (#12, #15)
T. Kura – all instruments (#1, #8, #13)
Wilson Montuori – classical guitar, electric guitar (#12, #15)
Daniel O. Morgan – backing vocals (#3)
Pochi – keyboard (#11)
Steph Pockets – background vocals (#7)
Shingo S. – keyboard (#11)
Sachi – announcement voice (#9)
Miyuki Saito – background vocals (#7)
Yumi Sakakibara – strings (#5)
James Spears – piano (#15)
Emily Taguchi – strings (#5)Visuals and imageryNoriko Goto – Stylist
Akihisa Inoue – design assisting
Misato Kumamoto – art direction, design

Hiroshi Nomura – photographer
Akemi Ono – hair, make-up
Emu Yanagihara – microphone sculptureTechnical and production'''

2 Soul – arrangement, production (#12, #15)
Ai – production (#4)
Aquarius – production (#2)
Aaron "AB" Belinfanti – editing, instrument recording, programming (#12, #15)
C-murder – vocal recording (#10-#11)
D.O.I – mixing (#2-#3, #5, #10)
DJ Yutaka – arrangement (#11), production (#10, #11), sound effects (#9)
D/R Period – co-production (#4), programming (#4, #6)
Michael "Bump" Fountain – co-production, engineering (#7)
Icedown – programming, production (#3, #5)
Masahiro Kawaguchi – mixing (#11)
Rich Keller – mixing (#12, #15)

T. Kura – arrangement, instrument recording, mixing, production (#1, #8, #13)
Yasufumi Maruyama – recording (#2)
Taiji Okada – vocal recording (#1, #3-#4, #8, #13)
Steph Pockets – production (#7)
Geoffrey Rice – assistant engineer (#15)
Mitsuro "Boo" Shibamoto – vocal recording (#12, #15)
Shingo S. – arrangement, production (#11)
Tatsuya Sato – mixing (#4)
Yuya Suzuki – recording (#5)
Mike Tschupp – assistant engineer (#12)

Charts

Sales and certifications

Release history

References 

2005 albums
Ai (singer) albums
Japanese-language albums
Universal Music Group albums
Island Records albums
Universal Sigma albums